Massimo Battara (born 3 May 1963) is an Italian football coach and a former player, who played as a goalkeeper. He currently works as a goalkeeping coach with the Italy national football team. He has worked with Roberto Di Matteo both at Aston Villa and at FC Schalke 04. Between 2009 until his resignation in May 2013, he was the goalkeeping coach at Manchester City.

Career
Battara has also worked at Inter Milan and with ex Manchester City manager Roberto Mancini, and joined City in December 2009 as part of Mancini's new coaching team.

He worked under David Platt in India at FC Pune City before joining Roberto Di Matteo at Aston Villa in 2016.

Honours
Manchester City
 FA Cup: 2010–11 (as goalkeeping coach)

References

External links
 Profile at wlecce.it 

1963 births
Footballers from Genoa
Living people
Italian footballers
Association football goalkeepers
Manchester City F.C. non-playing staff
Benevento Calcio managers
Italian football managers
Association football goalkeeping coaches